Israel participated in and won the Eurovision Song Contest 2018. The Israeli broadcaster Israeli Public Broadcasting Corporation (IPBC/Kan) collaborated with the commercial broadcaster Keshet and Tedy Productions, which organised the reality singing competition HaKokhav HaBa L'Eurovizion ("The Next Star For Eurovision") to select the singer. The winner of the Israeli national selection was Netta Barzilai, and a committee of the Israeli broadcaster internally selected the song "Toy" for her.

Background 

Prior to the 2018 contest, Israel had participated in the Eurovision Song Contest forty times since its first entry in 1973. Israel has won the contest on three occasions: in 1978 with the song "A-Ba-Ni-Bi" performed by Izhar Cohen and the Alphabeta, in 1979 with the song "Hallelujah" performed by Milk and Honey, and in 1998 with the song "Diva" performed by Dana International. Since the introduction of semi-finals to the format of the Eurovision Song Contest in 2004, Israel has, to this point, managed to qualify to the final seven times, including three top ten results in 2005 with Shiri Maimon and "HaSheket SheNish'ar" placing fourth, in 2008 with Boaz and "The Fire in Your Eyes" placing ninth, and in 2015 with Nadav Guedj and "Golden Boy" placing ninth. Israel had failed to qualify to the final for four consecutive years between 2011 and 2014 prior to their qualification in 2015. In 2017, Imri Ziv represented Israel in Kyiv, Ukraine with the song "I Feel Alive". It ended 23rd out of 26 entries in the final.

The Israeli entry for the 2018 Contest in Lisbon, Portugal was selected through the reality singing competition HaKokhav HaBa L'Eurovizion ("The Next Star for Eurovision"), which was organised by Keshet and Tedy Productions. This was the fourth time that the Israeli entry was selected through a collaboration with Keshet and Tedy Productions.

Before Eurovision

HaKokhav HaBa L'Eurovizion 

The singer who performed the Israeli entry for the Eurovision Song Contest 2018 was selected through the reality singing competition HaKokhav HaBa L'Eurovizion ("The Next Star for Eurovision"), the original version of the international format Rising Star, produced by Tedy Productions and Keshet Media Group. HaKokhav HaBa has been used since 2015 to select the Israeli artist for Eurovision. The shows was hosted by Assi Azar and Rotem Sela and featured a judging panel composed of Asaf Amdursky, Keren Peles, Harel Skaat (2010 Israeli Eurovision entrant) and Static & Ben-El Tavori.
The competition consisted of twenty shows, which commenced on 29 October 2017 and concluded on 13 February 2018. All shows in the competition were broadcast on Channel 2 and Keshet 12 as well as online via mako.co.il.

Out of the selected 120 contestants ninety-nine were shown in the televised auditions where performers were required to achieve 70% of the votes during their performance in order to advance; each member of the judging panel could boost a performer's score by 10%. Following a change in the rules of the competition, the hosts of the shows could also save performers who did not manage to achieve 70% of the votes during the audition phase, thus the selected performers would also advance, regardless to their scores during the auditions. In the end, seventy contestants advanced to the next round instead of the original seventy-one, following one contestant's withdrawal from the competition.

In the shortlisting round the remaining seventy contestants were required to perform in front of the jury. The jury then selected twenty performers who qualified for the next stage of the competition.

The twenty performers were reduced to twelve in heat 1 and 2, and then from twelve to ten in heat 3 and 4.

Auditions

Audition 1 
The first audition was broadcast in two parts on 29 and 31 October 2017. Seven of the nine contestants advanced to the next phase following achieving at least 70% of the votes while one contestant who did not get enough votes to qualify was saved by the hosts.

Among the contestants was Chen Aharoni, who previously participated in the 2011 national final where he placed fourth with the song "Or".

Audition 2 
The second audition was broadcast on 5 November 2017. Six of the eight contestants advanced to the next phase following achieving at least 70% of the votes.

Among the contestants was Rinat Bar who previously participated in the 2005 national final where she placed seventh with the song "Kmo chalom".

Audition 3 
The third audition was broadcast on 12 November 2017. Five of the eight contestants advanced to the next phase following achieving at least 70% of the votes while one contestant who did not get enough votes to qualify was saved by the hosts.

Among the contestants was Alon Sharr, the lead singer of the band The Choice who previously took part in the Eurovision Song Contest 2017 as a backing vocalist behind Imri. Noa Bell is the adopted daughter of Keren Peles, therefore Peles was not able to vote during her audition. Her vote was cast by Ben-El Tavori.

Audition 4 
The fourth audition was broadcast in two parts on 19 and 20 November 2017. Eight of the eleven contestants advanced to the next phase following achieving at least 70% of the votes while one contestant who did not get enough votes to qualify was saved by the hosts. However, on 26 November 2017 it was confirmed that Liat Banai, who has originally qualified to the next phase, has withdrawn from the competition.

Dori Halevi is a close friend of Ben-El Tavori, therefore Tavori was not able to vote during his audition.

Audition 5 
The fifth audition was broadcast in two parts on 26 and 27 November 2017. Eight of the eleven contestants advanced to the next phase following achieving at least 70% of the votes while one contestant who did not get enough votes to qualify was saved by the hosts.

Among the contestants was Keshet Ben Ze'ev, the nephew of Izhar Cohen who (together with Alphabeta) won the Eurovision Song Contest 1978 with the song "A-Ba-Ni-Bi" and who finished fifth in the Eurovision Song Contest 1985 with the song "Olé, Olé".

Audition 6 
The sixth audition was broadcast in two parts on 3 and 4 December 2017. Six of the eleven contestants advanced to the next phase following achieving at least 70% of the votes while one contestant who did not get enough votes to qualify was saved by jury members Static and Ben-El Tavori instead of the hosts following a temporary switch in the roles during the contestants' audition.

Among the contestants was Joseph Guedj, a relative of Nadav Guedj who represented Israel in the Eurovision Song Contest 2015 where he placed ninth with the song "Golden Boy".

Audition 7 
The seventh audition was broadcast in two parts on 10 and 11 December 2017. Six of the eleven contestants advanced to the next phase following achieving at least 70% of the votes while one contestant who did not get enough votes to qualify was saved by the hosts.

Among the contestants was Almog Kapach who previously took part in the Eurovision Song Contest 2016 and 2017 as a backing vocalist behind Hovi Star and IMRI and also participated in the previous edition of the competition as a member of the band Beatbox Element, finishing fourth.

Audition 8 
The eighth audition was broadcast in two parts on 17 and 18 December 2017. Seven of the thirteen contestants advanced to the next phase following achieving at least 70% of the votes while two contestants who did not get enough votes to qualify were saved by the hosts.

Zohar Raziel would have originally got eliminated, however the judges exceptionally gave her a second chance to perform another song where she eventually advanced to the next stage of the competition.

Among the contestants was Mishéll who previously participated as Irina Rosenfeld in the 2006 Ukrainian national final where she placed second with the song "You Give Me Your Love".

Audition 9 
The ninth audition was broadcast on 21 December 2017. Four of the eight contestants advanced to the next phase following achieving at least 70% of the votes while one contestant who did not get enough votes to qualify was saved by the hosts.

Audition 10 
The tenth audition was broadcast in two parts on 24 and 25 December 2017. Three of the nine contestants advanced to the next phase following achieving at least 70% of the votes while two contestants who did not get enough votes to qualify were saved by the hosts.

Shortlisting round 
The shortlisting round was broadcast in two parts on 28 and 31 December 2017. The remaining seventy contestants performed in front of the jury. Following the performances, the four-member jury selected twenty contestants to go through to the heats.

Elimination shows

Heat 1 
The first heat was broadcast on 4 January 2018. Eight of the twenty qualified contestants were paired in four duels. From each duel, the performer with the higher score advanced to the next round while one contestant was saved by the jury at the end of the second part of the second heat.

For the first time in the history of the competition, a guest judge also voted for the performances: Ninet Tayeb, singer-songwriter, composer, DJ, model and actress. Therefore, each judge could boost each performance by 8% instead of the original 10.

Heat 2 
The second heat was broadcast in two parts on 7 and 8 January 2018. The remaining twelve of the twenty contestants were paired in six duels. From each duel, the performer with the higher score advanced to the next round while one contestant was saved by the jury at the end of the second part of the second heat.

Heat 3 
The third heat was broadcast on 14 January 2018 and consisted of two rounds: in the first round six of the remaining twelve contestants were paired in three duels. From each duel, the performer with the higher score advanced to the next stage of the competition. In the second round the remaining three contestants would have had to perform one more song and the contestant with the lowest score would have got eliminated. However, following her performance Rinat Bar announced her withdrawal from the competition. Therefore, the remaining two contestants – Shay and Gilad and Riki Ben Ari – automatically qualified for the next stage without Riki Ben Ari performing.

Heat 4 
The fourth heat was broadcast on 21 January 2018 and consisted of two rounds: in the first round six of the remaining twelve contestants were paired in three duels. From each duel, the performer with the higher score advanced to the next stage of the competition. In the second round the remaining three contestants had to perform one more song and the contestant with the lowest score got eliminated.

For personal reasons one of the judges, Asaf Amdursky did not attend the fourth heat. To complement the jury panel, the winner of the second season and representative of Israel in the Eurovision Song Contest 2015, Nadav Guedj was invited to vote.

Heat 5 
The fifth heat was broadcast on 22 January 2018 and consisted of two rounds. In the first round the remaining ten contestants were paired in four thematical duels: in the first duel two duets were formed from four contestants. In the second duel the two contestants performed songs of their idols. In the third duel the contestants who have sung ballads before performed uptempo songs for the first time and in the fourth duel the two contestants performed in front of their relatives. From each duel the contestant or contestants with the higher score advanced to the next stage of the competition. In the end of the first round three contestants were saved by the judges and the remaining two contestants had to perform one more song in the second round. In the end the contestant with the lowest score got eliminated.

Heat 6 
The sixth heat was broadcast in two parts on 28 and 29 January 2018. All the contestants performed behind the wall except for the first contestant Adva Omer who performed in front of the judges and the audience. In the end the contestant with the lowest score got eliminated.

Quarter-final 
The quarter-final was broadcast in two parts on 4 and 7 February 2018 and consisted of two rounds: in the first round the remaining eight contestants were paired in four duels. From each duel, the performer with the higher score advanced to the next stage of the competition. In the second round the remaining four contestants were paired in two duels and had to perform one more song. The two contestants with the lower scores from each duel got eliminated.

In the end of the first round the judges selected two contestants from the four first round qualifiers – Netta Barzilai and Riki Ben Ari – who got paired in a duel that determined the first finalist in the first part of the semi-final.

In addition to the performances the winner of the previous season and representative of Israel in the Eurovision Song Contest 2017, IMRI performed the 2017 Israeli entry "I Feel Alive".

Semi-final 
The semi-final was broadcast in two sefond parts on 8 and 11 February 2018.

In the first part on 8 February the two contestants who were selected by the judges in the quarter-final – Netta Barzilai and Riki Ben Ari – were paired in a duel that determined the first finalist. In addition to their performances Barzilai and Ben Ari performed "Na'im achshav" by and together with Elai Botner and The Outside Kids before the duel.

The second part of the semi-final was broadcast on 11 February and consisted of two rounds: in the first round all the remaining five contestants performed behind the wall except for the first contestant Chen Aharoni who performed in front of the judges and the audience. In the end of the first round the contestant with the highest score qualified for the final.

In the second round the remaining four contestants were paired in two duels and had to perform one more song. The two contestants with the higher scores from each duel qualified for the final.

Final 
The final took place on 13 February 2018 and consisted of two rounds.

First round 
In the first round the four finalists were paired in two duels. From each duel the contestant with the higher score advanced to the second round. After the last performance each jury member (with the exception of Harel Skaat) named one of the remaining two contestants. The contestant with the most votes advanced to the second round.

In addition to the performances the four finalists performed a medley of the Eurovision Song Contest 2012 winning song "Euphoria" by Loreen and "Can't Hold Us" by Macklemore & Ryan Lewis feat. Ray Dalton.

The votes of the judges to save:
 Asaf Amdursky – Netta Barzilai
 Keren Peles – Netta Barzilai
 Harel Skaat – did not vote
 Static – Netta Barzilai
 Ben El Tavori – Chen Aharoni

Harel Skaat did not have to vote since it was already decided that Netta Barzilai would be saved from elimination.

Second round 
In the second round, the remaining three contestants performed in front of the judges and the audience. During each performance the votes were cast only by the viewers through the official mobile application, without the scores appearing on screen. After the last performance each judge cast its votes by giving 8, 10 and 12 points to the three remaining contestants; 8 points to their third favourite and 12 points to their favourite. Additionally, four thematical jury groups were asked to vote by the same method. The members of the four jury groups were:

 Group 1: Judges of Kokhav Nolad – Gal Uchovsky, Margalit Tzan'ani, Tzedi Tzarfati
 Group 2: Winners of HaKokhav HaBa L'Eurovizion that represented Israel in Eurovision in the past three years – Nadav Guedj, Hovi Star, Imri Ziv
 Group 3: Judges of Eyal Golan Is Calling You – Adi Leon, Yaron Ilan, Yossi Gispan
 Group 4: Composers of former Israeli Eurovision Song Contest entries – Doron Medalie, Kobi Oshrat, Svika Pick

In addition to the performances, the second round included guest performances of "Namaste" by the judges Static & Ben El Tavori, and "Ulay nedaber" by the 2015 Israeli representative Nadav Guedj.

At Eurovision 
According to Eurovision rules, all nations with the exceptions of the host country and the "Big Five" (France, Germany, Italy, Spain and the United Kingdom) are required to qualify from one of two semi-finals in order to compete for the final; the top ten countries from each semi-final progress to the final. The European Broadcasting Union (EBU) split up the competing countries into six different pots based on voting patterns from previous contests, with countries with favourable voting histories put into the same pot. On 29 January 2018, a special allocation draw was held which placed each country into one of the two semi-finals, as well as which half of the show they would perform in. Israel was placed into the first semi-final, to be held on 8 May 2018, and was scheduled to perform in the first half of the show.

Once all the competing songs for the 2018 contest had been released, the running order for the semi-finals was decided by the shows' producers rather than through another draw, so that similar songs were not placed next to each other. Israel was set to perform in position 7, following the entry from Lithuania and preceding the entry from Belarus.

Semi-final
Israel was an early favorite with the bookies, sitting in second place to win on the day of the first semi-final. Israel performed seventh in the first semi-final, following the entry from Lithuania and preceding the entry from Belarus. At the end of the night, Israel was one of the ten countries announced as qualifying for the grand final, their fourth qualification in a row since 2015. Following the semi-final, Netta joined the other new finalists in a press conference and a draw to see which half of the final she would perform in. Ultimately, Israel was drawn to perform in the second half of the final. It was later revealed that Israel won the first semi-final, scoring 283 points, 116 points from the televoting and 167 points from the juries.

Final
Israel performed twenty-second in the grand final, following Hungary and preceding the Netherlands. Following the jury vote, Israel was in third place behind Sweden in second and Austria first. However, neither Sweden nor Austria made it to the viewers' top ten, allowing Israel to both win the televote and the contest overall with a total of 529 points (Israel's highest-ever score). This marked Israel's fourth victory (after 1978, 1979, and 1998), tying them with the Netherlands as the 4th-most successful country in contest history (following France, Luxembourg, and the United Kingdom, with five wins; Sweden, with six wins; and Ireland, with seven wins). It was the twentieth time Israel finished in the top ten (the last occasion being Nadav Guedj and "Golden Boy," which finished 9th in 2015) and the eleventh they made the top five (the first time since 2005, when Shiri Maimon came 4th with "HaSheket SheNish'ar"). This meant Israel would host the 2019 contest and automatically qualify for the following year's final. Among these points were five top marks from the jury vote (awarded by Austria, the Czech Republic, Finland, France, and San Marino) and eight top marks from the televote (awarded by Australia, Azerbaijan, Georgia, Moldova, Spain, Ukraine, and once again France and San Marino). Estonia was the only country that did not award any points to Israel in either jury vote or televote.

Under the hybrid jury-televote system, Israel would have received twelve points from Australia, Austria, Croatia, the Czech Republic, Finland, France, Iceland, Moldova, San Marino, Spain, Sweden, Ukraine, and the United Kingdom.

Voting
Voting during the three shows involved each country awarding two sets of points from 1–8, 10 and 12: one from their professional jury and the other from televoting. Each nation's jury consisted of five music industry professionals who are citizens of the country they represent, with their names published before the contest to ensure transparency. This jury judged each entry based on: vocal capacity; the stage performance; the song's composition and originality; and the overall impression by the act. In addition, no member of a national jury was permitted to be related in any way to any of the competing acts in such a way that they cannot vote impartially and independently. The individual rankings of each jury member as well as the nation's televoting results were released shortly after the grand final.

Points awarded to Israel

Points awarded by Israel

Detailed voting results
The following members comprised the Israeli jury:

 Aya Korem (jury chairperson)singer, songwriter (jury member in semi-final 1)
 Eli Cohen (Eliko)radio DJ
 Dafna Lustigmusic journalist, radio DJ, TV host
 Yaakov Lamaimusical producer, arranger
 Gal Uchovskymusic journalist
 Hagai Uzanmusic journalist, producer, personal artist manager (jury member in the final)

Notes and references

Notes

References 

2018
Countries in the Eurovision Song Contest 2018
Eurovision